Zagaje may refer to the following places:

Zagaje, Kraków County in Lesser Poland Voivodeship (south Poland)
Zagaje, Proszowice County in Lesser Poland Voivodeship (south Poland)
Zagaje, Świętokrzyskie Voivodeship (south-central Poland)
Zagaje (Pawłowice), Gmina Sędziszów, Jędrzejów County, Świętokrzyskie Voivodeship (south-central Poland)
Zagaje, Strzelce-Drezdenko County in Lubusz Voivodeship (west Poland)
Zagaje, Świebodzin County in Lubusz Voivodeship (west Poland)
Zagaje, Pomeranian Voivodeship (north Poland)
Zagaje, Kwidzyn County in Pomeranian Voivodeship (north Poland)
Zagaje, Warmian-Masurian Voivodeship (north Poland)
Zagaje, West Pomeranian Voivodeship (north-west Poland)